Rudrangshu Mukherjee is an Indian historian and author of several major history books. He was formerly the Opinions Editor for The Telegraph newspaper, Kolkata and the Chancellor for Ashoka University, where he also serves as Professor of History. He was the founding Vice-Chancellor of Ashoka when the University began in 2014 and was succeeded in 2017 by Pratap Bhanu Mehta.

Academics

He studied at Calcutta Boys' School, Presidency College, Kolkata, Jawaharlal Nehru University, New Delhi, and St Edmund Hall, Oxford.

His 1980 D.Phil thesis at the University of Oxford was titled "The rebellion in Awadh, 1857-1858: a study in popular resistance". He has revisited his view of the revolt from the native perspective in books including Awadh in Revolt 1857-58: A Study of Popular Resistance (Delhi, 1984, repr. 2002), Spectre of Violence: The 1857 Kanpur Massacres (Delhi, 1988), and Mangal Pandey: Brave Martyr or Accidental Hero? (Penguin India).

Career
He has taught history at the University of Calcutta and held visiting appointments at Princeton University, the University of Manchester, the University of California, Santa Cruz and the Young India Fellowship, New Delhi.  At the Centre for Studies in Social Sciences, Calcutta (CSSSC), which he had joined as a Junior Research Fellow in 1975, he was involved in issues concerning the ascendancy of the North in the production of knowledge. He has edited The Penguin Gandhi Reader (Delhi, 1993) and is the author of the Art of Bengal: A Vision Defined, 1955-75 (Kolkata, 2003), and co-edited Trade and Politics and the Indian Ocean World: Essays in Honour of Ashin Das Gupta (Delhi, 1998).

He has authored and edited several books on other themes, including The Penguin Gandhi Reader, Trade and Politics and, the Indian Ocean World: Essays in Honour of Ashin Das Gupta, Remembered Childhood: Essays in Honour of Andre Beteille, New Delhi: The Making of a Capital and Great Speeches of Modern India. His latest book is Nehru and Bose.

He has also worked on the history of the leftist movement in India.
After the 2007 Nandigram episode, he was among those leftist intellectuals in Kolkata who protested the violent policies of the left.

References

Bengali Hindus
Bengali writers
20th-century Bengalis
21st-century Bengalis
Bengali historians
Presidency University, Kolkata alumni
Alumni of St Edmund Hall, Oxford
Indian writers
Indian male writers
Indian historians
Indian scholars
Indian journalists
Indian male journalists
Indian newspaper editors
Indian academics
Indian Marxist historians
Indian Marxist writers
Indian non-fiction writers
20th-century Indian historians
20th-century Indian writers
20th-century Indian male writers
20th-century scholars
20th-century Indian non-fiction writers
21st-century Indian writers
21st-century Indian male writers
21st-century Indian historians
21st-century Indian scholars
21st-century Indian journalists
Writers from Kolkata
University of Calcutta alumni
Jawaharlal Nehru University alumni
Princeton University faculty
Year of birth missing (living people)
Living people